The Chosen Gyeongnam Railway (Japanese: 朝鮮京南鉄道株式会社, Chōsen Kyōnan Tetsudō Kabushiki Kaisha; Korean: 조선경남철도주식회사, Joseon Gyeongnam Cheoldo Jusikhoesa), was a privately owned railway company in Japanese-occupied Korea.

History
Following the partition of Korea, the entirety of the Chosen Gyeongnam Railway's network was located in the American zone of occupation. All railways in South Korea, including the Chosen Gyeongnam Railway, were nationalised in 1946, becoming part of the Korean National Railroad.

The Chosen Gyeongnam Railway opened the following railway lines between 1912 and 1931:

 1912: Gunsan Line,  from Iri on the Chosen Government Railway's Honam Line to Gunsan;
 1919–1927: Gyeonggi Line,  from Cheonan on the Chosen Government Railway's Gyeongbu Line to Janghowon;
 1922–1931: Chungnam Line,  from Cheonan to Janghang Jangyo;
 1931: Gunsanhang Line,  from Gunsan to Gunsan Port (became Gunsanbudu (Gunsan Wharf) Station) in 1943.

After the nationalisation, the Korean National Railroad took over these lines, eventually rearranging them. The Gunsan–Gunsan Wharf section of the Gunsan Line was detached to create the Gunsan Freight Line, whilst the Iri–Gunsan section of the Gunsan Line and the entirety of the Ch'ungnam Line from Gunsan to Cheonan were merged to create the Janghang Line in 1955. The Gyeonggi Line was renamed Anseong Line (ko) in the same year.

Services
In the November 1942 timetable, the last issued prior to the start of the Pacific War, the Chōsen Gyeongnam Railway was running extensive passenger services on the Chungnam Line, along with three daily round trips on the Gyeonggi Line.

Rolling Stock
Few details are available about the rolling stock operated by the Chosen Gyeongnam Railway; known are the 100 series and 200 series 2-6-2T tank locomotives, which were later used by the KNR as the Pureo7-100 and Pureo7-200 classes. In addition, two locomotives identical to the Japanese Government Railways Class C11 were delivered new in 1935 and 1936 from Hitachi, numbered 25 (w/n 624) and 26 (w/n 725) respectively.

Network

References

Rail transport in South Korea
Rail transport in Korea
Korea under Japanese rule
Defunct companies of Japan
Defunct railway companies of Korea